Nekrasovsky (masculine), Nekrasovskaya (feminine), or Nekrasovskoye (neuter) is the name of several inhabited localities in Russia.

Urban localities
Nekrasovsky, Moscow Oblast, a work settlement in Dmitrovsky District of Moscow Oblast
Nekrasovskoye, a work settlement in Nekrasovsky District of Yaroslavl Oblast

Rural localities
Nekrasovsky, Krasnodar Krai, a khutor in Kiyevsky Rural Okrug of Krymsky District of Krasnodar Krai
Nekrasovsky, Orenburg Oblast, a settlement in Verkhnebuzuluksky Selsoviet of Totsky District of Orenburg Oblast
Nekrasovsky, Tambov Oblast, a settlement in Nizhneshibryaysky Selsoviet of Uvarovsky District of Tambov Oblast
Nekrasovskaya, Krasnoborsky District, Arkhangelsk Oblast, a village in Alexeyevsky Selsoviet of Krasnoborsky District of Arkhangelsk Oblast
Nekrasovskaya, Lensky District, Arkhangelsk Oblast, a village in Lensky Selsoviet of Lensky District of Arkhangelsk Oblast
Nekrasovskaya, Krasnodar Krai, a stanitsa in Nekrasovsky Rural Okrug of Ust-Labinsky District of Krasnodar Krai
Nekrasovskaya, Vologda Oblast, a village in Mishutinsky Selsoviet of Vozhegodsky District of Vologda Oblast